is a Japanese politician of the Liberal Democratic Party, a member of the House of Representatives in the Diet (national legislature). A native of Tokushima, Tokushima, he graduated from the University of Tokyo in March 1967. He then joined the Ministry of Agriculture and Forestry, which is now part of Ministry of Agriculture, Forestry and Fisheries. In June 1997 he also received a Ph.D in agriculture while still in the ministry. He left the ministry in the following year to run for the House of Representatives in the 2000 election but lost. He ran again in 2003 and was elected for the first time.

References

External links 
 Official website in Japanese.

1943 births
Living people
People from Tokushima (city)
University of Tokyo alumni
Members of the House of Representatives (Japan)
Liberal Democratic Party (Japan) politicians
21st-century Japanese politicians